Detours to Happiness (German: Umwege zum Glück) is a 1939 German drama film directed by Fritz Peter Buch and starring Ewald Balser, Lil Dagover and Viktor Staal.  It was shot at the Tempelhof Studios in Berlin and on location in Kitzbühel in the Tyrol in annexed Austria. The film's sets were designed by the art directors Wilhelm Depenau and Ludwig Reiber. It was distributed by UFA, Germany's largest film company of the era.

Cast
 Ewald Balser as Thomas Bracht
 Lil Dagover as 	Hanna Bracht
 Eugen Klöpfer as 	Vater von Hanna
 Viktor Staal as 	Mathias Holberg
 Claire Winter as 	Marianne Schlüter
 Roma Bahn as Gast bei Brachts
 Elfe Gerhart as Jeanette Danieli
 Erich Dunskus as Viehhändler
 Walter Gross as Konzertgast 
 Elisabeth Botz as 	Hannas Wirtschafterin
 Erich Ziegel as Dr. Wismar
 Franz Stein as Dr. Lehmann
 Oscar Sabo as Fröbe
 Hans Brausewetter as Burmann 
 Vera Complojer as Frau Börnham
 Herbert Weissbach as 	Gast bei Bracht
 Franz Weber as Diener von Bracht
 Albert Venohr as Chauffeur von Bracht
 Carl Heinz Peters as Gast bei Brachts
 Walter Ladengast as Komponist
 Araca Makarova as Tänzerin

References

Bibliography 
 Klaus, Ulrich J. Deutsche Tonfilme: Jahrgang 1939. Klaus-Archiv, 1988.
 Niven, Bill, Hitler and Film: The Führer's Hidden Passion. Yale University Press, 2018.
 Rentschler, Eric. The Ministry of Illusion: Nazi Cinema and Its Afterlife. Harvard University Press, 1996.

External links 
 

1939 films
Films of Nazi Germany
German drama films
1939 drama films
1930s German-language films
Films directed by Fritz Peter Buch
UFA GmbH films
1930s German films
Films shot at Tempelhof Studios
Films shot in Austria